Elizabeth L. McKinnon (13 January 1925 – 24 June 1981) was an Australian sprinter who won a silver medal in 4 x 100 metres relay with teammates Shirley Strickland, June Maston and Joyce King at the 1948 Summer Olympics in London.

References
Profile
Betty McKinnon's profile at Sports Reference.com

1925 births
1981 deaths
Olympic athletes of Australia
Olympic silver medalists for Australia
Athletes (track and field) at the 1948 Summer Olympics
Australian female sprinters
Medalists at the 1948 Summer Olympics
Olympic silver medalists in athletics (track and field)
Olympic female sprinters
20th-century Australian women
Sportswomen from New South Wales
Athletes from Sydney